Berezovsky is a rural locality (a settlement) and the administrative center of Zheleznodorzhny Selsoviet, Pankrushikhinsky District, Altai Krai, Russia. The population was 400 as of 2013. There are 8 streets.

Geography 
Berezovsky is located 17 km southwest of Pankrushikha (the district's administrative centre) by road. Beregovoye is the nearest rural locality.

References 

Rural localities in Pankrushikhinsky District